George Helela Onekea Jr. (born March 25, 1939) is an American former competition swimmer who represented the United States as a 17-year-old at the 1956 Summer Olympics in Melbourne, Australia.  Onekea competed in the preliminary heats of the men's 400-meter freestyle and men's 1,500-meter freestyle, recording times of 4:41.6 and 19:13.6 in those events, respectively, but not placing.

See also
 List of Ohio State University people

References

1939 births
Living people
American male freestyle swimmers
Ohio State Buckeyes men's swimmers
Olympic swimmers of the United States
Swimmers from Honolulu
Swimmers at the 1956 Summer Olympics